Praise the Lord is a 2014 Malayalam film directed by Shibu Gangadharan and starring Mammootty, Akanksha Puri and Mukesh . The film has been adapted from Zacharia's eponymous novelette, T. P. Devarajan has written the screenplay. The film was produced by Milan Jaleel under the banner of Galaxy Films. It released on 20 March 2014.

Cast
 Mammootty as Joy
 Akanksha Puri as Annie
 Mukesh as Sunny
 Reenu Mathews as Ancy
 Ahmed Sidhique as Samkutty
 Anoop Krishnan as Samkutty's friend
 Kalabhavan Shajon as Father Antony
 Joy Mathew as Kaduvakunnil Kunjutty
 Suresh Krishna as C.I. Balakrishnan
Mani C. Kappan as M P Mathachan
 Indrans as Chacko
 Kailash as Alwin, Annie's boy friend
Sadiq as Kuttappan
 Sajitha Betti as Kochu Rani
 Anoop Chandran as Sonykutty
 Dinesh Panicker as Cherian Varghese
Pauly as Karthyayani
 Noby as Kulappuram Vakkan
Adinad Sasi as Kunjiraman
Mohan Ayiroor as Yohannan
Kalabhavan Haneef as Police constable
Nasser Lathif as English Sermon Preacher

Music
The film features songs composed by Shaan Rahman while Bijibal composed the background score. Manorama Music bought the music rights of Praise the Lord.

References

External links
 

2014 films
2010s Malayalam-language films
Films based on short fiction
Films scored by Shaan Rahman
Films scored by Bijibal